Scopula grisescens is a moth of the  family Geometridae. It is found in Uzbekistan.

References

Moths described in 1892
grisescens
Moths of Asia